Michael Calvin (born 3 August 1957) is an English journalist and writer.

Career
Calvin established a global reputation during a 12-year spell as Chief Sportswriter on The Daily Telegraph. He held similar positions at The Times and Mail on Sunday, and is a current columnist for the Sunday Mirror. He has twice been named Sportswriter of the Year, twice named Sports Reporter of the Year and has been honoured at the British Press awards on six other occasions. He won the Sports Journalists' Association Sports Writer of the Year prize in 1992 and won the British Sports Book Award in consecutive years with books The Nowhere Men and Proud (co-written with Gareth Thomas). He took a four-year sabbatical from journalism to help set up and run the English Institute of Sport, which provides strategic support to 35 Olympic sports.

Calvin's first book, Cricket Captaincy, was published in 1979. His second, Only Wind and Water, was a result of his participation in a round the world yacht race. His third book "Family: Life, Death and Football" was released in October 2010. Calvin was given access to every aspect of the activities of Millwall F.C. throughout their 2009–2010 playoff-winning season.

Personal life
Originally from the Watford area, Calvin has lived in Bedfordshire for over 20 years, with his wife and four children.

References

External links
Official Website

1957 births
Living people
English male journalists
English bloggers
British male bloggers
British sports journalists
People from Watford
People from Bedfordshire
Writers from Hertfordshire